The Rhineland Football Association, the FVR, is one of 21 state organisations of the German Football Association, the DFB, and covers the northern part of the state of Rhineland-Palatinate.

The FVR is also part of the Southwestern Regional Football Association, one of five regional federations in Germany. The other member of the regional association are the Southwest German Football Association and the Saarland Football Association.

In 2017, the FVR had 182,416 members, 1,049 member clubs and 3,849 teams playing in its league system.

References

External links
 German FA website  
 Southwestern Regional FA website  
 FVR website 

Football in Rhineland-Palatinate
Football governing bodies in Germany
1949 establishments in West Germany